Christopher Kajoro Chiza (born 13 April 1953) is a Tanzanian CCM politician and Member of Parliament for Buyungu constituency since 2005 until 2015. He is the current Minister of Agriculture, Food and Cooperatives

References

1953 births
Living people
Tanzanian engineers
Chama Cha Mapinduzi MPs
Tanzanian MPs 2010–2015
Ministers of agriculture of Tanzania
Kigoma Secondary School alumni
Pugu Secondary School alumni
University of Dar es Salaam alumni
Alumni of the University of Southampton